Yaniv Katan (born 27 January 1981) is a retired Israeli international footballer who played professionally for Maccabi Haifa, as a forward and winger. He earned 31 caps for Israel, scoring five goals.

Personal life
Katan was born in Kiryat Ata, Israel, and is Jewish.

Club career
In December 2005, Katan signed a four-year contract with West Ham United, where he joined up with Israeli international teammate Yossi Benayoun. The transfer, which was officially completed during the January 2006 transfer window, involved a cut-price fee of £100,000, as Katan had only six months left on his Maccabi contract. He made eight appearances, including six from the bench, for West Ham.

At the end of the 2005–06 season, Katan moved back to Maccabi Haifa in a loan deal, with a view to a permanent move, after Alan Pardew reportedly told him he was no longer in his plans. He returned to Israel and made his loan deal permanent by signing a new four-year deal with Haifa.

After 25 years in Maccabi Haifa, on 19 June 2014, Katan decided to retire from active playing. On 5 April 2015, a farewell ceremony for Katan was held at the Sammy Ofer Stadium on which both Maccabi Haifa's chairman Ya'akov Shahar and Katan led a speech and the fans held a giant flag with Katan's pictures.

Career statistics

Club

Honours
Maccabi Haifa
Israeli Championships
Winner (6): 2000–01, 2001–02, 2003–04, 2004–05, 2008–09, 2010–11
Runner-up (5): 1999–2000, 2002–03, 2009–10, 2012–13
Toto Cup
Winner (3): 2002–03, 2005–06, 2007–08
State Cup
Runner-up (4): 2002, 2009, 2011, 2012

West Ham United
FA Cup
Runner-up (1): 2006

See also
List of select Jewish football (association; soccer) players

References

External links

Yaniv Katan profile and stats on FootballDatabase.com
 Yaniv Katan profile and club history on Maccabi Haifa Official Website
 Yaniv Katan Profile and Statistics on One.co.il
  After 25 years in Maccabi Haifa, On 19 June 2014, Katan decided to retire from active playing.

1981 births
Israeli Jews
Living people
Association football forwards
Israeli footballers
Maccabi Haifa F.C. players
West Ham United F.C. players
Israel international footballers
Liga Leumit players
Israeli Premier League players
Premier League players
Israeli expatriate footballers
Expatriate footballers in England
Israeli expatriate sportspeople in England
Israeli people of Iraqi-Jewish descent
Footballers from Kiryat Ata